Santa Monica Place is an outdoor shopping mall in Santa Monica, California. The mall is located at the south end of Santa Monica's Third Street Promenade shopping district, two blocks from the beach and Santa Monica Pier. The mall spans 3 levels. The anchor store is Nordstrom. The mall's tenant mix is predominantly upscale, featuring Tiffany & Co., Louis Vuitton, Tory Burch, Elie Tahari, and AllSaints.

It underwent a massive, three-year reconstruction process beginning in January 2008 and was re-opened as a modern outdoor shopping mall on August 6, 2010.

History
Santa Monica Place originally opened as an indoor mall in 1980 at the apex of Santa Monica's Third Street Promenade, developed jointly by The Rouse Company and The Hahn Company. Originally anchored by J. W. Robinson's and The Broadway, it featured 120 shops, restaurants and a food court, spanning three levels. Notably, Santa Monica Place was one of the first works of architect Frank Gehry and his first shopping mall, after being rejected from designing The Mall in Columbia in Columbia, Maryland, early in his professional career with Gruen Associates. In the 1990s, both anchor stores changed names. In 1993, the Robinson's store rebranded as Robinsons-May while The Broadway store rebranded as Macy's in 1996.

Macerich purchased Santa Monica Place from Rouse in 1999, and rumors of major changes to the then-flailing shopping center were reported. In 2004, the company proposed tearing down the mall and replacing it with a  complex of high-rise condos, shops and offices. The plan met with strong opposition from local residents who felt the project did not meet the low-rise character of the neighborhood and would worsen traffic. In 2006, Robinsons-May closed as a result of Federated buying out May Department Stores in 2005. The store was replaced by Steve & Barry's in 2007. In a second 2007 proposal, Macerich significantly scaled back its plans, which was received as positive by the public, and was passed.

The $265 million project removed the mall's roof and gutted the interior, replacing it with two levels of retail shops and a third-level food court. At the same time, Kevin Kennon Architects converted the original Macy's into a Bloomingdale's while the Steve & Barry's was replaced with a Nordstrom. Dallas-based Omniplan served as the executive architects in association with The Jerde Partnership who served as the design architects. The grand reopening occurred on August 6, 2010. The architect for the redesign was Jon Jerde. It was his last major work before he died. The mall was officially reopened on August 6, 2010.

On November 15, 2015 an Arclight Cinemas multiples opened in a new structure atop the Bloomingdale's anchor store.

On January 6, 2021, Bloomingdale's announced as part of a strategy to focus on their highest achieving locations that this location would shutter on March 28, 2021. The space is set to transform into a 48,000-square-foot location for Arte Museum, an immersive museum. The location will also takeover the lease for Arclight Cinemas which has remained shuttered since March 17, 2020 due to the COVID-19 pandemic. The remaining leftover space is set to house other uses including high-end fitness. 

On April 12, 2021 it was announced that the lease for the temporarily shuttered Arclight Cinemas was terminated for non payment of rent as a direct result of the COVID-19 pandemic. The space, along with the space which was formerly Bloomingdale's, is set to transform into a 48,000-square-foot location for Arte Museum, an immersive museum, with the remaining space set to house other uses including high-end fitness.

On January 23, 2023, it was announced Arte Museum, an immersive museum planned and produced by D’strict, a digital design company based in Seoul, South Korea will open a 48,000-square-foot location in the space which was formerly Bloomingdale's and Arclight Cinemas. It was also announced by Macerich, the mall development corporation, that it's remaining space is set to house other uses including high-end fitness. Macerich further elaborated in a prepared statement that the new development "provides a terrific example of how Macerich consistently works to evolve the retail, dining and entertainment offerings in each of our markets to match consumer preferences”.

Public transit access 

The LACMTA E Line terminus station is located across the street from the former Bloomingdale's. In addition, many Santa Monica Big Blue Bus routes serve the mall.

References

External links
 

Commercial buildings completed in 1980
Buildings and structures in Santa Monica, California
Landmarks in Los Angeles
Frank Gehry buildings
Shopping malls established in 1980
Macerich
Shopping malls on the Westside, Los Angeles
Tourist attractions in Santa Monica, California
1980 establishments in California